Pixel Federation, Ltd. is a Slovak game developer and publisher focusing on mobile and social networking platforms. It was founded in 2007 with headquarters in Bratislava, Slovakia. Notable titles they have published include Diggy's Adventure, Seaport, Train Station, and Emporea. 

With the success of TrainStation in 2012, Pixel Federation became one of the top 20 Facebook game-developing studios in the EMEA region. In 2017, it was recognized as a fast-growing tech startup in Central and Eastern Europe. The company has over 250 employees and has earned more than €28,131,334 in revenues.

Games

References

External links 
 Official Website

Video game development companies
Video game companies of Slovakia
Video game companies established in 2007
Slovakian companies established in 2007
Companies based in Bratislava